Aaron Alexander Russell (April 2, 1879 – September 29, 1949) was an American Negro league third baseman in the 1910s.

A native of Chattanooga, Tennessee, Russell played for the Homestead Grays in 1918. He died in Grove City, Pennsylvania in 1949 at age 70.

References

External links
Baseball statistics and player information from Baseball-Reference Black Baseball Stats and Seamheads

1879 births
1949 deaths
Homestead Grays players
Baseball third basemen
Baseball players from Tennessee
Sportspeople from Chattanooga, Tennessee
20th-century African-American people